Karina Klimyk (born 12 December 1999) is a Tajikistani swimmer. She competed in the women's 50 metre breaststroke event at the 2017 World Aquatics Championships. In 2014, she represented Tajikistan at the 2014 Summer Youth Olympics held in Nanjing, China.

References

External links
 

1999 births
Living people
Tajikistani female breaststroke swimmers
Place of birth missing (living people)
Swimmers at the 2014 Summer Youth Olympics
Swimmers at the 2018 Asian Games
Asian Games competitors for Tajikistan